Events from the year 1769 in France.

Incumbents 
Monarch: Louis XV

Events
16 March – Louis Antoine de Bougainville returns to Saint-Malo, following a three-year circumnavigation of the world with the ships La Boudeuse and Étoile, with the loss of only seven out of 330 men; among the members of the expedition is Jeanne Baré, the first woman known to have circumnavigated the globe (she returns to France some time after Bougainville and his ships).
8 May – Battle of Ponte Novu begins between royal French forces and the native Corsicans.
9 May – Battle of Ponte Novu ends, marking the end of the Corsican War and paving the way for French dominance over the island.
23 October – Nicolas-Joseph Cugnot demonstrates a steam-powered artillery tractor (or 'automobile').

Births

January to June
1 January – Marie-Louise Lachapelle, midwife (died 1821)
10 January – Michel Ney, Marshal of France (died 1815)
31 January – André-Jacques Garnerin, inventor of the frameless parachute (died 1823)
1 March – François Séverin Marceau-Desgraviers, general (died 1796)
9 March – Adélaïde Binart, neoclassical painter (died 1832)
29 March – Jean-de-Dieu Soult, Marshal General of France and three times Prime Minister of France (died 1851)
10 April – Jean Lannes, general (mortally wounded in battle) (died 1809)
13 April – Charles Mathieu Isidore Decaen, general (died 1832)
21 April – Alexandre-Antoine Hureau de Sénarmont, artillery general (died 1810)
25 April – Marc Isambard Brunel, engineer (died 1849 in the United Kingdom)

July to December
29 July – Louis-Benoît Picard, playwright (died 1828)
15 August – Napoleon Bonaparte, military and political leader (died 1821 in Saint Helena)
23 August – Georges Cuvier, naturalist and zoologist (died 1832)
10 October – Augustin Alexandre Darthé, Revolutionary (executed 1797)
28 December – Auguste Hilarion, comte de Kératry, poet, novelist, historian and politician (died 1859)

Full date unknown
Barthelemy Lafon, Louisiana Creole architect, engineer, city planner, surveyor and smuggler (died 1820 in the United States)

Deaths
5 April – Marc-Antoine Laugier, Jesuit priest and architectural theorist (born 1713)
01 August – Jean-Baptiste Chappe d'Auteroche, astronomer (born 1722)
23 September – Michel Ferdinand d'Albert d'Ailly, astronomer (born 1714)
3 November – Diane Adélaïde de Mailly, third of the five de Nesle sisters (born 1713)

See also

References

1760s in France